The Federal Ministry of Food and Agriculture, abbreviated BMEL, is a cabinet-level ministry of the Federal Republic of Germany. Its primary headquarters are located in Bonn with a secondary office in Berlin. From 1949 to 2001 it was known as the Ministry for Food, Agriculture and Forests. Through an organizational order by the German Chancellor on 22 January 2001, it became the Federal Ministry for Consumer Protection, Food and Agriculture after the Consumer protection function was transferred from the Federal Ministry for Health (Bundesministerium für Gesundheit). The name Federal Ministry for Food, Agriculture and Consumer Protection was adopted on 22 November 2005 simply to alphabetize its functional parts in the German language. Due to the political restructurings of the 18th German Bundestag in December 2013 the division "Consumer Protection" was transferred to the Federal Ministry of Justice and Consumer Protection.

Organization 
The current Minister for Food and Agriculture is Cem Özdemir. The Parliamentary State Secretaries are Hans-Joachim Fuchtel and Uwe Feiler. Beate Kasch is the Permanent State Secretary. In addition to the Ministry Management (including management staff), it consists of eight departments (as of September 2020):

 Department 1: Central Division
 Department 2: Consumer health protection, nutrition, product safety
 Department 3: Food safety, animal health
 Department 4: Agricultural markets, food industry, export
 Department 5: Forests, sustainability, renewable raw materials
 Department 6: EU affairs, international cooperation, fisheries
 Department 7: Agricultural production, horticulture, agricultural policy
 Department 8: Rural development, digital innovation

Agencies 
Under the auspices of the BMEL are various Federal agencies, legally independent institutions under public law and government research institutes:

 Federal Office of Consumer Protection and Food Safety
 Federal Agency for Agriculture and Food
 Federal Office of Plant Varieties
 Federal Institute for Risk Assessment (BfR)
 Julius Kühn-Institut, Federal Research Center for Cultivated Plants
 Friedrich-Loeffler-Institut, Federal Research Institute for Animal Health
 Max Rubner-Institut, Federal Research Institute for Nutrition and Food
 Johann Heinrich von Thünen-Institut, Federal Research Institute for Rural Areas, Forestry and Fisheries
 Agency for Renewable Resources

Federal Ministers

See also 
List of Federal Ministers of Food, Agriculture and Consumer Protection (Germany)
Julius Kühn-Institut
Federal Institute for Risk Assessment (BfR)

References

External links 
 Website 

Food and Agriculture
Germany
Germany, Food and Agriculture
2005 establishments in Germany
Germany
Forestry in Germany
Agricultural organisations based in Germany